Dixieland is a 2015 American crime drama film, written and directed by Hank Bedford. The film stars Chris Zylka, Riley Keough, Spencer Lofranco, Steve Earle, and Faith Hill. The film had its world premiere at the Tribeca Film Festival on April 19, 2015. The film was released in a limited release and through video on demand on December 11, 2015, by IFC Films.

Plot
Fresh out of prison, Kermit (Chris Zylka), a good hearted kid who got in trouble with some drug dealers, returns home to his Mississippi trailer park. As Kermit struggles to keep clean, he falls for Rachel (Riley Keough), his neighbor who’s turned to dancing in a strip club to support her sick mother. Kermit and Rachel make a desperate effort to escape their dead-end town.

Cast

 Chris Zylka as Kermit
 John Clofine as Young Kermit
 Riley Keough as Rachel
 Spencer Lofranco as Billy
 Steve Earle as Uncle Randy
 Faith Hill as Arletta
 RJ Mitte as CJ
 Brad Carter as Larry Pretty
 Pedro Anaya Perez as Flavor
 Davis Cannada as Clay
 Sergio Figueroa as Jorge
 Carl Frischer as Jc
 Shy Pilgreen as Mercedes
 Mick Foley as himself

Production
On November 5, 2014, it was announced Faith Hill, Chris Zylka, Riley Keough, RJ Mitte, Spencer Lofranco, Brad Carter, and Steve Earle had all been cast in the film.

Release
The film had its world premiere at the Tribeca Film Festival on April 19, 2015. Shortly after it was announced IFC Films had acquired distribution rights to the film.  The film was released in a limited release and through video on demand on December 11, 2015.

References

External links

2015 films
2015 crime drama films
American crime drama films
Films scored by West Dylan Thordson
Films set in Mississippi
2015 directorial debut films
2010s English-language films
2010s American films